Tibor Vadai (born 13 February 1913, date of death unknown) was a Hungarian rower. He competed in the men's coxless four at the 1936 Summer Olympics.

References

External links

1913 births
Year of death missing
Hungarian male rowers
Olympic rowers of Hungary
Rowers at the 1936 Summer Olympics
Place of birth missing